The following is a list of notable and historically significant people from Portugal.

Navigators, explorers and pioneers

15th century

 Afonso Gonçalves Baldaia, explorer of the African coast
 Álvaro Caminha, explorer of the Atlantic islands
 Álvaro Martins, explorer of the African coast
 Alvise Cadamosto, explorer of the Atlantic islands and of the African coast
 André Gonçalves, explorer of the sea route to Brazil
 Antão Gonçalves, explorer of the African coast
 Álvaro Fernandes, explorer of the African coast
 Bartolomeu Dias, explorer of the African coast
 Bartolomeu Perestrelo, explorer of the Atlantic islands
 Dinis Dias, explorer of the African coast
 Diogo Cão, explorer of the African coast
 Diogo de Azambuja, explorer of the African coast
 Diogo de Teive, explorer of the Atlantic islands
 Diogo Dias, explorer of the Atlantic islands, of the African coast and the Indian Ocean, discovered Madagascar
 Diogo Silves, explorer of the Atlantic islands
 Duarte Pacheco Pereira, explorer of the Atlantic
 Fernão do Pó, explorer of the African coast
 Gil Eanes, explorer of the African coast
 Gonçalo Velho, explorer of the Atlantic islands
 João de Santarém, explorer of the Atlantic islands
 João Gonçalves Zarco, explorer of the Atlantic islands
 João Grego, explorer of the African coast
 João Infante, explorer of the African coast
 João Vaz Corte-Real, explorer of North America
 Lopes Gonçalves, explorer of the Atlantic
 Luís Pires, explorer of the sea route to Brazil
 Nicolau Coelho, explorer of the sea route to Brazil
 Nuno Tristão, explorer of the African coast
 Paulo da Gama, explorer of the sea route to India
 Pedro Álvares Cabral, discoverer of Brazil in 1500
 Pedro Escobar, explorer of the Atlantic islands
 Pêro de Alenquer, explorer of the African coast
 Pêro de Sintra, explorer of the African coast
 Pêro Dias, explorer of the African coast
 Pêro Vaz de Caminha, explorer of the sea route to Brazil
 Tristão Vaz Teixeira, explorer of the Atlantic islands
 Vasco da Gama, led the discovery of the sea route to India in 1498

15th/16th century
 Afonso de Paiva, diplomat and explorer in Ethiopia
 Fernão de Noronha, explorer of the Atlantic
 Gaspar de Lemos, explorer of the Atlantic and of the sea route to Brazil
 Gonçalo Coelho, explorer of the South American coast
 João Fernandes Lavrador, explorer of North America
 Pêro da Covilhã, diplomat and explorer in Ethiopia and India
 Pêro de Barcelos, explorer of North America

16th century
 Afonso de Albuquerque, naval admiral and viceroy of India
 António de Abreu, explorer of Indonesia
 António Mota, among the first to reach Japan
 Bento de Góis, explorer
 Cristóvão Jacques, explorer of the Brazilian coast
 Cristóvão de Mendonça, some have claimed he discovered Australia; this is disputed
 Diogo Lopes de Sequeira, explorer of the Indian Ocean
 Diogo Rodrigues, explorer of the Indian Ocean
 Duarte Fernandes, diplomat in Thailand
 Estevão da Gama, explorer of the Indian Ocean
 Fernão Lopez, soldier in India and first resident of the island of Saint Helena
 Fernão Mendes Pinto, among the first to reach Japan
 Fernão Pires de Andrade, merchant in China
 Francisco Álvares, missionary and explorer in Ethiopia
 Francisco de Almeida, explorer and viceroy of India
 Gaspar Corte-Real, explorer of North America
 Gomes de Sequeira, some claim he discovered Australia; this is disputed
 João da Nova, explorer of the Atlantic and of the Indian Ocean
 Jorge Álvares, the first to reach China
 João Rodrigues Cabrilho, discoverer of California
 Lourenço Marques, trader and explorer in East Africa
 Martim Afonso de Sousa, explorer and soldier in India
 Miguel Corte-Real, explorer of North America
 Paulo Dias de Novais, colonizer of Africa
 Pedro Mascarenhas, explorer of the Indian Ocean
 Tristão da Cunha, naval general and discoverer
 Ferdinand Magellan, led the first successful attempt to circumnavigate the Earth (1519–1522); explorer of the Pacific Ocean

17th century
 Estêvão Cacella, missionary and explorer of Tibet, first European in Bhutan
 Baltasar Fernandes, explorer of Brazil's interior
 Jerónimo Lobo, missionary and explorer of Ethiopia
 Luís Vaz de Torres, 16th-century/17th-century explorer of south-west Pacific
 Pedro Fernandes de Queirós, 16th-century/17th-century explorer of south-west Pacific, some claim he discovered Australia
 Pedro Teixeira, explorer of the Amazon River
 António Raposo Tavares, bandeirante

18th century
 Alexandre Rodrigues Ferreira, explorer of Brazil's interior
 Francisco de Lacerda, explorer of Africa

19th century
 Manoel Viriato da Gaia, explorer of Brazil 
 Alexandre de Serpa Pinto, explorer of Africa
 António da Silva Porto, explorer of Africa
 Hermenegildo Capelo, explorer of Africa
 Roberto Ivens, explorer of Africa

20th century

 Gago Coutinho and Sacadura Cabral, first to cross the South Atlantic Ocean by air

Monarchs 

 Monarchs of Portugal

Saints

 Amador of Portugal (Early Christianity)
 Anthony of Lisbon (1195–1231)
 Basileus (1st century)
 Beatrice of Silva (1424–1490)
 Elizabeth of Portugal (1271–1336)
 Felix the Hermit (9th century)
 Francisco Marto (1908–1919)
 Fructuosus of Braga (7th century)
 Irene of Tomar (7th century)
 Jacinta Marto (1910–1920)
 João Baptista Machado (16th/17th century)
 John de Brito (1647–1693)
 John of God (1495–1550)
 Julia (3rd century)
 Mantius of Évora (Early Christianity)
 Martin of Braga (520–580)
 Maxima (3rd century)
 Nuno Álvares Pereira (1360–1431)
 Peter of Rates (1st century)
 Quiteria (5th century)
 Rita Amada de Jesus (1848–1913)
 Rudesind (10th century)
 Saint Ovidius (1st and 2nd centuries)
 Theotonius (1088–1166)
 Verissimus (3rd century)
 Victor (3rd century)
 Wilgefortis (folk saint)

Blessed

 Alexandrina of Balasar (1904–1955)
 Amadeus of Portugal (1420–1482)
 Bartolomeu dos Mártires (1514–1590)
 Ferdinand the Holy Prince (1402–1443)
 Inácio de Azevedo (1528–1570)
 Joan, Princess of Portugal (1452–1490)
 Mafalda of Portugal (1190–1256)
 Sancha of Portugal (1180–1229)
 Teresa of Portugal (1181–1250)
 Elizabeth of Portugal (1282–1325)

Religious
 António de Andrade (1580–1634), missionary, explorer of Tibet
 António Vieira (1608–1697), writer, diplomat and preacher
 João Ferreira Annes de Almeida (1628–1691), missionary
 Paulo António de Carvalho e Mendonça (1702–1770), priest and cardinal, Inquisitor-General of the Holy Inquisition
 Lúcia de Jesus dos Santos (1907–2005), visionary, involved in the 1917 Fátima events
 Paulus Orosius (385–420), historian, theologian and disciple of St. Augustine

Popes

 Damasus I, 4th-century pope
 John XXI, 13th-century pope

Philosophers
 Agostinho da Silva (1906–1996)
 António Castanheira Neves (born 1929)
 António Sérgio (1883–1969)
 Damião de Góis (1502–1574)
 Eduardo Lourenço (1923–2020)
 José Gil (born 1939)

Musicians
 Adriano Correia de Oliveira (1942–1982), singer
 Alfredo Keil (1850–1907), composer of the Portuguese anthem
 Ana Free, singer
 Ana Moura (born 1979), singer, fadista
 António Zambujo (born 1975), singer, fadista
 Alfredo Marceneiro (1891–1982), fado singer
 Amália Rodrigues (1920–1999), the most famous fado singer
 António Fragoso (1897–1918), piano composer
 António Pinho Vargas (born 1951), classical, jazz and piano composer
 António Variações (1944–1984), singer-songwriter
 Aurea, singer
 Camané (born 1967), singer, fadista
 Carlos do Carmo (1939–2021), singer, fadista
 Carlos Paredes (1925–2004), Portuguese guitar player
 Carlos Seixas (1704–1742), composer
 Cristina Branco (born 1972), fado singer
 Danny Fernandes, singer
 David Fonseca (born 1973), singer
 Diogo Piçarra, singer
 DJ Vibe, DJ
 Duarte Lobo (1565–1646), composer
 Dulce Pontes (born 1969), singer
 Fernando Lopes Graça (1906–1995), composer
 Fernando Ribeiro (born 1974), Moonspell vocals
 Francisco d'Andrade (1856–1921), international opera baritone
 Guilhermina Suggia (1885–1950), cellist
 Isabel Soveral (born 1961), composer
 Jay Kay (born 1969), singer; Portuguese father
 João Domingos Bomtempo (1775–1842), composer
 Joaquim José Antunes (1725–1790), harpsichord maker
 Jorge Palma (born 1950), singer, pianist and songwriter
 José Afonso (1929–1987), aka Zeca Afonso, composer, player
 Luciana Abreu (born 1985), singer, composer, actress, TV host
 Lúcia Moniz (born 1976), singer, actress
 Luís de Freitas Branco (1890–1955), composer
 Luísa Todi (1753–1833), lyrical singer
 Mafalda Arnauth (born 1974), fado singer
 Malvina Garrigues (1825–1904), opera soprano
 Manuela Azevedo, singer
 Maria João Pires (born 1944), piano player
 Maria João (born 1956), jazz singer
 Mário Laginha (born 1960), piano player
 Mariza (born 1973), fado singer
 Mísia, fado singer
 Nelly Furtado, singer
 Nuno Bettencourt (born 1966), guitarist, singer-songwriter
 Paulo Furtado, blues performer
 Pedro de Escobar (c. 1465 – 1535), composer
 Rita Guerra (born 1967), singer
 Rita Redshoes, singer
 Rui da Silva, disc jockey
 Rui Veloso (born 1957), singer
 Salvador Sobral (born 1989), singer
 Sara Tavares (born 1978), singer
 Shawn Desman, singer
 Shawn Mendes, singer
 Sérgio Godinho (born 1948), singer
 Steve Perry, lead singer of band Journey
 Teresa Salgueiro (born 1969), Madredeus vocals
 Tim (born 1960), player, vocals Xutos & Pontapés
 José Vianna da Motta (1868–1948), piano player, composer
 Vitorino (born 1942), singer

Writers

Fictionists
 Agustina Bessa-Luís
 Alexandre Herculano
 Almeida Garrett, also a poet and playwright
 Alves Redol, neo-realist writer
 António Lobo Antunes
 Aquilino Ribeiro, neo-realist writer
 Bernardim Ribeiro
 Camilo Castelo Branco
 Carlos de Oliveira
 Eça de Queiroz
 Gonçalo M. Tavares
 Hélia Correia
 Inês Pedrosa
 Irene Lisboa (1892–1958)
 João Aguiar, writer
 José Cardoso Pires
 José Rodrigues Miguéis (1901–1980), writer
 José Saramago, Nobel Prize for Literature in 1998
 Júlio Dinis
 Mário de Sá-Carneiro, novelist and poet
 Miguel Torga, also a poet
 Ramalho Ortigão
 Raul Brandão (1867–1930)
 Soeiro Pereira Gomes, neo-realist writer
 Vergílio Ferreira
 Vitorino Nemésio

Poets
 Ana Luísa Amaral
 Antero de Quental
 António Nobre
 Camilo Pessanha
 Cesário Verde
 David Mourão-Ferreira
 Eugénio de Andrade
 Fernando Pessoa, poet writer philosopher, described as one of the most significant literary figures of the 20th century
 Fiama Hasse Pais Brandão, poet and writer
 Guerra Junqueiro, poet and writer
 Herberto Hélder
 Jorge de Sena, writer and poet
 José Gomes Ferreira, writer
 Luís Vaz de Camões, poet, playwright
 Manuel Alegre, poet, writer and politician
 Manuel Maria Barbosa du Bocage
 Orlando da Costa, poet and playwright
 Sá de Miranda
 Sophia de Mello Breyner Andresen
 Teixeira de Pascoaes
 Vasco Graça Moura

Others
 Agostinho da Silva, writer and philosopher
 Alice Vieira, children's books writer
 Almada Negreiros
 Álvaro Cunhal, neo-realist writer
 Álvaro Magalhães, writer
 Ana de Castro Osório, writer and pioneer feminist
 André de Resende, writer
 António Ferreira (poet)
 António José da Silva, playwright
 António Vieira (1608–1697), preacher and writer
 Damião de Góis, writer
 Eduardo Lourenço
 Fernão Lopes (c. 1380–1458), royal chronicler
 Gil Vicente, playwright
 Gomes Eanes de Zurara, chronicler
 João de Barros, writer and historian
 Luiz Pacheco (1925–2008), writer and editor
 Natália Correia, writer and poet
 Raul Proença (1884–1941), writer
 Rosa Lobato Faria, writer
 Rui de Pina, chronicler
 Tomé Pires (1465–1540), author of the Suma Oriental
 Urbano Tavares Rodrigues, writer and journalist

Artists
 Sofia Areal, painter
 Almada Negreiros (1893–1970), 20th-century painter
 Amadeo de Souza Cardoso (1887–1918), 20th-century painter
 Ana Dias (born 1984), photographer of erotic femininity
 António Soares dos Reis (1847–1889), 19th-century sculptor
 Aurélia de Souza (1865–1922), 19th/20th-century painter
 Columbano Bordalo Pinheiro (1857–1929), 19th/20th-century painter
 Eduardo Gageiro (born 1935), 20th-century photographer
 Fernando Lanhas (1923–2012)
 Filipe Alarcão (born 1963), urban and modern contemporary designer
Helena Corrêa de Barros (1910-2000), 20th-century photographer
 João M. P. Lemos, cartoonist
 José Dias Coelho, 20th-century artist
 José Malhoa, 19th-century painter
 Joshua Benoliel (1873–1932), 19th/20th-century photographer
 Júlio Pomar (1926–2018), 20th-century painter
 Marco Mendes (born 1978), comic artist
 Manuel Pereira da Silva (1920–2003), 20th-century sculptor
 Nadir Afonso (1920–2013), geometric abstract painter
 Nuno Gonçalves, 15th-century painter
 Paula Rego, 20th-century painter
 Rafael Bordalo Pinheiro, 19th-century caricaturist
 Raquel Gameiro (1889–1970), painter and illustrator
 Vasco Fernandes (Grão Vasco), 15th-century painter
 Vieira da Silva, 20th-century painter

Scientists
 Abel Salazar (1889–1946)
 Alexandre Quintanilha (born 1945)
 André de Resende (c. 1500 – 1573)
 António A. de Freitas (born 1947), immunologist
 António Damásio (born 1944), neurologist
 Bartolomeu de Gusmão (1685–1724), inventor
 Bento de Jesus Caraça (1901–1948), mathematician
 Diogo Abreu (born 1947), geographer
 Egas Moniz (1874–1955), neurologist and Nobel Prize for Medicine in 1949
 Freitas-Magalhães (born 1966), psychologist
 Garcia de Orta (c. 1499 – 1568), botanical scientist
 Hanna Damásio (born 1942), neurologist
 Jacob de Castro Sarmento (c. 1691 – 1762)
 João de Pina-Cabral (born 1954), anthropologist
 João Magueijo (born 1967), physicist
 Miguel Vale de Almeida (born 1960), anthropologist
 Benedita Barata da Rocha (born 1949), immunologist
 Orlando Ribeiro (1911–1997), geographer
 Pedro Nunes (1502–1578), mathematician and cosmographer
 Raquel Seruca (1962-2022), oncobiologist
 Sousa Martins (1843–1897)
 Tomé Pires (c. 1465–c. 1540)

Engineers and architects

 Álvaro Siza Vieira (born 1933), architect
 João Luís Carrilho da Graça, architect
 Edgar Cardoso (1913–2000), engineer
 Eduardo Souto de Moura, architect
 Fernando Távora (1923–2005), architect
 José Tribolet, engineer, IST professor
 Tomás Taveira (born 1938), architect
 António Maria Braga, architect

Psychiatrists
 João dos Santos

Actors and directors

Actors
 Alexandra Lencastre (born 1965)
 Ana Rita Machado (born 1991)
 António Silva
 Beatriz Batarda
 Beatriz Costa
 Carmen Miranda (1909–1955), singer and actress
 Daniela Melchior
 Daniela Ruah
 Diogo Infante
 Diogo Morgado
 Eunice Muñoz (1928–2022)
 Fernando Rocha (born 1975), comedian, actor
 Francisco Ribeiro (1911–1984), actor, comedian, film director, theatre director
 Herman José (born 1954), actor and humourist
 João Villaret (1913–1961), actor and poetry reader
 Joaquim de Almeida (born 1957)
 Maria de Medeiros
 Maria Matos (1890–1952)
 Nicolau Breyner
 Nuno Lopes (born 1978)
 Raul Solnado, actor and humourist
 Vasco Santana (1898–1958)

Directors
 António Lopes Ribeiro (1908–1995)
 Constantino Esteves
 Diana Andringa
 João César Monteiro (1939–2003)
 João Pedro Rodrigues
 Luís Miguel Cintra (born 1948)
 Manoel de Oliveira (1908–2015)
 Marco Martins (born 1972)
 Miguel Gomes
 Pedro Costa
 Rita Azevedo Gomes
 Vasco Nunes (1974–2016), director, cinematographer, producer

Others
 Vera Mantero (born 1966), dancer and choreographer

Soldiers
 Álvaro Vaz de Almada (count of Avranches) (1390–1449), knight of the Garter, Captain-major of Portugal, killed in battle
 Fernando de Almada (count of Avranches) (1430–1496), Captain-major of Portugal
 Otelo Saraiva de Carvalho (1936–2021), chief strategist of the Carnation Revolution of Portugal
 Aníbal Augusto Milhais (1895–1970), most decorated soldier Ordem de Torre e Espada do Valor, Lealdade e Mérito of Portugal
 Salgueiro Maia (1944–1992), Captain who led a cavalry unit into Lisbon during the Carnation Revolution of Portugal

Sports

Football
 Carlos Queiroz, football coach
 Costinha (born 1974), football player
 Cristiano Ronaldo (born 1985), football player
 Dinis Vital (1932–2014), football player
 Eusébio (1942–2014), football player, born in Portuguese Mozambique; later moved to Portugal
 José Mourinho, football coach
 João Félix, football player
 João Moutinho, football player
 Luís Figo (born 1972), football player
 Luís Miguel Afonso Fernandes, football player
 Maniche (born 1977), football player
 Nani, football player
 Nuno Gomes, football player
 Pauleta, football player
 Paulo Ferreira, football player
 Paulo Futre, former football player
 Paulo Sousa, former football player
 Ricardo Carvalho, football player
 Ricardo Pereira, football player
 Ricardo Quaresma (born 1983), football player
 Ricardo Sá Pinto, football player
 Rui Costa (born 1972), football player
 Simão Sabrosa (born 1979), football player
 Vítor Baía (born 1969), football player

Others
 Ana Rocha, professional wrestler
 António Jesus Correia (1924–2003)
 António Livramento (1944–1999), hockey player
 Carlos Lopes (born 1947), marathon Olympic champion
 Carlos Sousa, off-road driver, world champion in 2003
 Fernanda Ribeiro (born 1969), 10,000m Olympic champion
 Francis Obikwelu, Nigerian-born runner
 Joaquim Agostinho, cyclist
 José Azevedo, cyclist
 João Sousa, tennis player
 Moises Henriques, Australian cricketer from Portugal
 Nelson Évora, long jump Olympic and world champion
 Pedro Lamy, former Formula One and DTM driver
 Rosa Mota (born 1958), marathon Olympic champion
 Rui Costa, cycling world champion
 Telma Monteiro, four times judo silver medalist at world championships
 Tiago Monteiro, former Champ Car and Formula One driver
 Ticha Penicheiro, WNBA player
 Vanessa Fernandes, triathlon world champion

Politicians
 Afonso Costa (1871–1937), Prime Minister during the First Republic
 Alberto João Jardim (born 1943), President of Regional Government of the Madeira Autonomous Region for 37 years
 Álvaro Cunhal (1913–2005), former General Secretary of the Portuguese Communist Party
 Aníbal Cavaco Silva, Prime Minister and President of the Republic
 Anton de Vieira (1682–1745), governor of St Petersburg and Okhotsk
 António de Oliveira Salazar (1889–1970), head of government and de facto leader of the Estado Novo dictatorial regime for 36 years
 António Guterres, Prime Minister, Secretary-General of the United Nations, United Nations High Commissioner for Refugees and President of the Socialist International
 António Vitorino, Minister, judge of the Constitutional Court, EU Commissioner and Director General of the International Organization for Migration
 Bento Gonçalves (1902–1942), General Secretary of the Portuguese Communist Party
 Carlos Alberto da Mota Pinto (1936–1985), Prime Minister
 Carlos Carvalhas (born 1941), General Secretary of the Portuguese Communist Party
 Diogo Freitas do Amaral, President of the General Assembly of the United Nations and Minister of Foreign Affairs
 Duarte Pio, Duke of Bragança, claimant to the abolished throne of Portugal
 Francisco Sá Carneiro (1934–1980), Prime Minister
 Jaime Ornelas Camacho (1921–2016), first President of the Regional Government of Madeira
 Jerónimo de Sousa (born 1947), General Secretary of the Portuguese Communist Party
 Jorge Sampaio, President of the Republic and Mayor of Lisbon
 José Manuel Barroso, Prime Minister and President of the European Commission
 José Sócrates, Prime Minister
 Manuel Pinho (born 1954), Minister of the Economy and Innovation
 Marcelo Caetano (1906–1980), last head of government of the Estado Novo dictatorial regime, from 1968 to 1974
 Mário Soares (1924–2017), Prime Minister and President of the Republic
 Octávio Pato (1925–1999)
 Pedro Santana Lopes, Prime Minister and Mayor of Lisbon
 Teresa Heinz Kerry, philanthropist and wife of US Senator John Kerry
 Vasco Gonçalves (1922–2005), Prime Minister
 Sebastião José de Carvalho e Melo, 1st Marquis of Pombal (1699–1782), statesman

Historians
 Diogo do Couto (1542–1616), historian of India and Sri Lanka
 José Hermano Saraiva (1919–2012)

Businesspeople
 Américo Amorim (1934–2017)
 Belmiro de Azevedo (1938–2017)
 Francisco Pinto Balsemão (born 1937)
 Joe Berardo (born 1944)
 Salvador Caetano (1926–2011)
 António Champalimaud (1918–2004)
 Antonia Ferreira (1811–1896), winemaker

Other
 Catarina de Albuquerque (born 1970), UN Special Rapporteur
 Mariana Alcoforado (1624–1723), nun and writer
 Rita Almeida (born 1974), World Bank economist
 Jorge de Cabedo (1525–1604), jurist
 Catarina Eufémia (1928–1954), assassinated rural worker
 Abraham Aboab Falero, 17th century Jewish philanthropist
 Aires de Ornelas e Vasconcelos (1837–1880), 19th-century archbishop of the Portuguese colonial enclave Goa
 Fernando Pessa (1902–2002), journalist
 Sara Sampaio (born 1991), model

See also
List of Portuguese monarchs
Presidents of Portugal
List of prime ministers of Portugal
List of mayors of Lisbon

References